A motorbike roller coaster is a type of steel roller coaster designed with motorcycle type cars. Booster Bike at Toverland was the world's first motorbike roller coaster. Vekoma was the first company to design such a ride, although Intamin and Zamperla have since created similar designs.

A similar but unrelated Steeplechase roller coaster was Knott's Berry Farm's Motorcycle Chase by Arrow Dynamics which opened in 1976. That attraction featured single motorbike themed vehicles racing side-by-side, each on one of four parallel tracks, launched together. It was retrofitted in 1980 as Wacky Soap Box Racers until removed in 1996.

Design

Vekoma

The Vekoma Motorbike Coaster consists of a train with nine cars, each consisting of two motorcycle seats. Each seat was designed to replicate the seating on a motorcycle, and allows free upper body movement.

After dispatching from the station, the train is hydraulically launched into a twisting layout. The first Motorbike coaster was the Booster Bike at Toverland in The Netherlands, opened in 2004. A second, Velocity opened at Flamingo Land Theme Park and Zoo in the United Kingdom. A third, identical to the Booster Bike, opened at Chimelong Paradise in China.

The Vekoma Motorbike Coaster concept was demonstrated with the use of the No Limits roller coaster simulator, and is included as a track style in the commercial version.

Intamin

Intamin was the second company to come up with a motorbike roller coaster design. Their design utilizes drive tires to launch its trains. Currently, only four installations exist - two in Australia, one in Denmark, and one  in the United States.

Zamperla

The Zamperla Motocoaster consists of a train of six cars instead of nine, but they are set up similarly, two seats side by side per car.

Zamperla's coaster uses a flywheel launch instead of a hydraulic launch system. The standard track layout is a 3-layered figure 8.

In 2008 2 MotoCoasters were installed in the United States. The prototype is at Darien Lake near Buffalo, New York.

The Pony Express at Knott's Berry Farm, Buena Park, California, in a twist on the once famous Motorcycle Chase of Indian Motorcycles on a Steeplechase roller coaster, now sports a Zamperla Motocoaster styled as horses.

Installations

References

External links

 Intamin official website
 Vekoma official website

Types of roller coaster